Louis "Loe" de Jong (24 April 1914 in Amsterdam – 15 March 2005 in Amsterdam) was a Dutch historian who specialised in the Netherlands in World War II and the Dutch resistance.

De Jong studied history and social geography at the University of Amsterdam. He worked as a foreign correspondent before the Second World War, from 1938 to 1940. On 31 August 1939 he wrote in relation to German aggression against Poland, that he believed would not escalate into war, "the Second World War has been averted for a long time [for the immediate future], probably for years", appearing in print on 2 September. He later wrote on 6 April 1940 that there was no indication whatsoever that "Berlin thinks of expanding the war [into other countries]". After the German invasion of the Netherlands, De Jong managed to escape to London with his wife Liesbeth Cost Budde on 15 May 1940 on board of the Friso. He would work for Radio Oranje.

The magnum opus of Loe de Jong, The Kingdom of the Netherlands During World War II (Dutch: Het Koninkrijk der Nederlanden in de Tweede Wereldoorlog), in fourteen volumes and 18,000 pages, is the standard reference on the history of the Netherlands during World War II. The Dutch Institute for War Documentation (NIOD) made an electronic edition of the entire work available for downloading from 11 December 2011, licensed under creative commons CC BY 3.0.

De Jong contributed to many other histories on the Netherlands and spoke at symposia on the European resistance. In 1988, De Jong was awarded the Gouden Ganzenveer for his contributions to Dutch written and printed culture.
In 1963 he became member of the Royal Netherlands Academy of Arts and Sciences.

Loe de Jong was Jewish by birth. He lost the greater part of his family, including his parents and his twin brother, during the Second World War.

He escaped The Holocaust by fleeing to England - together with his wife - when the Germans invaded the Netherlands. During this time he worked for Radio Oranje, broadcasting out of London to the occupied Netherlands.

See also 
 The Silent Historian - a film about Loe de Jong
 Jean-Louis Crémieux-Brilhac (1917–2015), a French historian with a similar profile

References

Further reading

External links

Errol Morris writes on Loue de Jong in the New York Times, June 3, 2009

 

1914 births
2005 deaths
20th-century Dutch historians
Dutch people of World War II
Dutch Jews
Members of the Royal Netherlands Academy of Arts and Sciences
Writers from Amsterdam
Dutch media executives
Historians of the Holocaust
Historians of World War II
20th-century Dutch journalists